VSMPO-AVISMA Corporation is the world's largest titanium producer. Located in Verkhnyaya Salda, Russia, VSMPO-AVISMA also operates facilities in Ukraine, England, Switzerland, Germany, United States and poselok Beryozovsky. The company produces titanium, aluminum, magnesium and steel alloys. VSMPO-AVISMA does a great deal of business with aerospace companies around the world, such as Boeing and Airbus.

VSMPO is a part of Rostec — a Russian state-owned defense company. As of February 2022, VSMPO produced 90% of titanium in Russia and exported it to 50 countries all over the globe.

VSMPO stands for VerkhneSaldinskoye Metallurgicheskoye Proizvodstvennoye Ob'yedineniye (or Metal-producing company of Verkhnyaya Salda; and AVISMA for AVIatsionnyye Spetsial'nyye MAterialy or AVIation Special MAterials).

History
After Rosoboronexport obtained an 66% stake in October 2006 of VSMPO-Avisma, Sergey Chemezov became chairman of VSMPO-AVISMA in November 2006.

On 27 December 2007 US Boeing and VSMPO-AVISMA created a joint venture Ural Boeing Manufacturing and signed a contract on titanium products deliveries until 2015. Boeing planning to invest 27 billion dollars in the production of titanium parts for its needs.

The company is a key organizer of the Titanium Valley project.

In November 2021, “VSMPO-AVISMA” and Boeing signed an agreement to increase producing capacity of JV Ural Boeing Manufacturing (UBM) as well as project investment cost of R&D sector. The agreement maintains the role of “VSMPO-AVISMA” as the biggest titanium supplier for Boeing. Only four months later, following the Russian invasion of Ukraine, the agreement was terminated, as well as a 2007 agreement.

In November 2021, the Arbitration Court of Sverdlovsk Oblast ordered to the company to pay 651 million roubles for pollution on ground area of 347538 square meters pro rata to Federal Service for Supervision of Natural Resources legal action.

Controversies

Sanctions

2014–2022
Despite VSMPO-AVISMA's affiliation to Rostec, the company was not affected by the American and European sanctions during the first phase of the Russo-Ukrainian War. In December 2020, the company was temporarily included in the American sanction list due to its connections with the Russian Armed Forces, but later the US lifted the sanctions against VSMPO-AVISMA.

2022–onwards
Following the Russian invasion of Ukraine in February 2022, several international companies ceased their collaboration with VSMPO-AVISMA. Thus, in March 2022, Rolls-Royce Holdings and Boeing suspended purchasing titanium from the company for an indefinite period.

Related organizations

Subsidiaries
CJSC Tube Works VSMPO-AVISMA
Nikopol, Ukraine
VSMPO-Tirus UK
Redditch, United Kingdom
VSMPO-Tirus UK is VSMPO-AVISMA's sales and distribution centre for UK customers.
VSMPO – Tirus GmbH
Frankfurt-am-Main, Germany
VSMPO-Tirus US
Highlands Ranch, Colorado (Head Office)
Leetsdale, Pennsylvania (Eastern production center)
Ontario, California (Western production center)
VSMPO Tirus AG
Lausanne, Switzerland
NF&M International
Monaca, Pennsylvania

References

Literature

External links

Firmakes Titanium

Mining companies of Russia
Steel companies of Russia
Mining companies of the Soviet Union
Non-renewable resource companies established in 1941
Companies listed on the Moscow Exchange
Rostec
Companies based in Sverdlovsk Oblast
1941 establishments in the Soviet Union
Manufacturing companies established in 1941
Titanium companies